Vasheni is a village in Uran Taluka, Maharashtra state, India. The most common occupations in Vasheni are farmers, fishers and teachers. Uran, Pen and Panvel are the nearest towns or cities. The population of the village is 3,700. There are mainly Four sectors (nickname-Aali)
 Varchi Aali
 Khalchi Aali
 Tep Aali
 Belpada
 Maath Aali
 Dandeshwar

Vasheni is mainly occupied by people of Agri caste, for whom farming and fishing are main occupations of people. There are large numbers of teachers in Vasheni village. Vasheni has a high education rate compared to other villages.

There are following schools in vasheni village
 Raigad Jilha Parishad Shala Vasheni (Khalchi Aali)
 Raigad Jilha Parishad Shala Vasheni (Varchi Aali)
 Chhatrapati Shivaji Maharaj High School Vasheni
 Raigad Educaution Society English Medium School Vasheni

References 

Villages in Raigad district